Tottleworth is a small hamlet situated between Great Harwood and Rishton in Lancashire, England. It situated close to the confluence of Lidgett and Norden Brooks.

Hamlets in Lancashire
Geography of Hyndburn